"My Woman, My Woman, My Wife" is a song written and recorded by American country music artist Marty Robbins.  It was released in January 1970 as the first single and title track from the album My Woman, My Woman, My Wife.  The song was Robbins' 14th number one on the country chart.  The single spent a single week at number one and spent a total of 15 weeks on the country charts. The song won the Grammy Award for Best Country Song in 1971.

Charts

Weekly charts

Year-end charts

References

1970 singles
1970 songs
Marty Robbins songs
Songs written by Marty Robbins
Song recordings produced by Bob Johnston
Columbia Records singles